Tom Bevan is an American writer and media executive who is co-founder and, as of 2021, publisher of RealClearPolitics.

Tom Bevan graduated from Princeton University in 1991, after which he worked as an advertising account executive in Seattle, Chicago, and Miami with Leo Burnett and Crispin Porter + Bogusky. In 1993 he met John McIntyre; the two founded RealClearPolitics in 2000. In 2012 he co-authored, with Carl M. Cannon, The RealClearPolitics Political Download: Election 2012: The Battle Begins from Crown Publishing Group and, in 2018, was named number 23 on the Princeton Alumni Weekly's list of the 25 most influential alumni of Princeton University. As of 2021, Bevan is publisher of RealClearPolitics and also hosts a weekly radio show on WLS-AM.

References

Living people
Princeton University alumni
American media executives
Year of birth missing (living people)